Guram Kavtidze (born May 29, 1987 in Tbilisi, Georgia) is a rugby union player who currently plays as a prop for Lyon OU in the Top 14.

References

1987 births
Living people
Georgia international rugby union players
Rugby union props